Devin Booker (born February 28, 1991) is an American professional basketball player for Fenerbahçe of the Turkish Basketball Super League (BSL) and the EuroLeague.

High school career
Booker played high school basketball at Union County High School, in Union, South Carolina.

College career
After high school, Booker played college basketball at Clemson University, with the Clemson Tigers, from 2009 to 2013.

Professional career
Booker began his pro career in France, during the 2013–14 LNB Pro A season, with SLUC Nancy. Later that same year, he moved to the French 2nd Division club JL Bourg. He was named the Finals MVP of the 2013–14 LNB Pro B season.

In 2015, he joined the French 1st Division club Élan Chalon, where he also played in the FIBA Europe Cup, where Chalon finished in third place. In the 2015–16 LNB Pro A season, Booker was named the league's Most Valuable Player. 

In 2016, Booker agreed to join the New York Knicks for the NBA Summer League. On July 17, 2016, he signed with Bayern Munich of the BBL in Germany.  On July 12, 2017, Booker re-signed with Bayern for the 2017–18 season.  He averaged 12.4 points and 5 rebounds per game during the season. Booker re-signed with the team on July 17, 2018. 

On July 16, 2019, Russian club Khimki announced that they had signed with Booker to a one-year deal. On July 5, 2020, Booker officially renewed his contract with the Russian club Khimki with an option for an additional year, which also competes in the EuroLeague. 

On June 16, 2021, Booker signed a two-year deal with Fenerbahçe of the Turkish Basketball Super League.

Personal life
Booker's brother, Trevor, also played college basketball at Clemson and played a professionally in the National Basketball Association (NBA). Booker's cousin, Jordan Hill, is a former NBA player as well.

References

External links

 Devin Booker at draftexpress.com
 Devin Booker at eurobasket.com
 Devin Booker at euroleague.net
 Devin Booker at lnb.fr 
 

1991 births
Living people
American expatriate basketball people in France
American expatriate basketball people in Germany
American expatriate basketball people in Russia
American expatriate basketball people in Turkey
American men's basketball players
Basketball players from South Carolina
Centers (basketball)
Clemson Tigers men's basketball players
Élan Chalon players
FC Bayern Munich basketball players
Fenerbahçe men's basketball players
JL Bourg-en-Bresse players
People from Whitmire, South Carolina
Power forwards (basketball)
SLUC Nancy Basket players